Chain of Blame: How Wall Street Caused the Mortgage and Credit Crisis is a 2008 book about the subprime mortgage crisis in the United States by investigative journalists Paul Muolo of National Mortgage News and Mathew Padilla of the Orange County Register. The book has an accompanying website  with some excerpts, author biographies and a roundup of events in the subprime mortgage crisis that occurred after the book was printed.

Overview 
The book analyses the causes of the subprime mortgage crisis in the United States in an attempt to assign responsibility for the collapse of a number of mortgage companies in 2007-2008 and for the sharp rise in mortgage defaults in the wake of the sudden tightening of mortgage credit in the summer and early fall of 2007. The authors find that, while blame can be laid at every link of the mortgage production chain (borrowers, brokers, wholesale lenders) the ultimate culprits are Wall Street firms that carelessly securitized mortgage loan pools without appropriate diligence and attention to the quality of the underlying loans.

Important personalities 
Angelo Mozilo, chairman of the board and chief executive officer of Countrywide Financial
Roland Arnall, owner of ACC Capital Holdings
Lewis Ranieri, former vice chairman of Salomon Brothers
Michael Blum, managing director in charge of global asset-based finance at Merrill Lynch
Bill Dallas, founder & CEO, Ownit Mortgage, a Merrill Lynch company
Stanley O'Neal, former CEO Merrill Lynch
Eric Billings, co-founder, chairman CEO, Friedman Billings Ramsey (FBR)
Kerry Killinger, CEO Washington Mutual
Ralph Cioffi, founder and senior portfolio manager Bear Stearns
Alan Greenspan, former chairman, Federal Reserve
Jack Mayesh, CEO, Long Beach Mortgage
Brad Morrice, co-founder New Century Financial
David Sambol, former president, Countrywide Financial Corp.
James Johnson, chairman and CEO, Fannie Mae
George Davies, loan trader Merrill Lynch

Publishing information

Japanese translation
In 2009 the book was published in Japanese by Nippon-Hyoron-Sha Co., Ltd. under the title サブプライム危機 : 実録. .

References

Works about the subprime mortgage crisis
Finance books
2008 non-fiction books
Derivatives (finance)